Cusco,  also spelled Cuzco, is a department and region in Peru and is the fourth largest department in the country, after Madre de Dios, Ucayali, and Loreto. It borders the departments of Ucayali on the north; Madre de Dios and Puno on the east; Arequipa on the south; and Apurímac, Ayacucho and Junín on the west. Its capital is Cusco, the historical capital of the Inca Empire.

Geography
The plain of Anta contains some of the best communal cultivated lands of the Department of Cusco.

Provinces
 Acomayo (Acomayo)
 Anta (Anta)
 Calca (Calca)
 Canas (Yanaoca) 
 Canchis (Sicuani)
 Chumbivilcas (Santo Tomás)
 Cusco (Cusco)
 Espinar (Yauri)
 La Convención (Quillabamba)
 Paruro (Paruro)
 Paucartambo (Paucartambo)
 Quispicanchi (Urcos)
 Urubamba (Urubamba)

Languages 
According to the 2007 Peru Census, the language learnt first by most of the residents was Quechua (51.40%), followed by Spanish (46.86%). The Quechua variety spoken in this department is Cusco Quechua.

The following table shows the results concerning the language learnt first in the Department of Cusco by province:

Toponyms 
Many of the toponyms of the Department of Cusco originate from Quechua and also Aymara. These names are overwhelmingly predominant throughout the region. Their Spanish-based orthography, however, is in conflict with the normalised alphabets of these languages. According to Article 20 of Decreto Supremo No 004-2016-MC (Supreme Decree) which approves the Regulations to Law 29735, published in the  official newspaper El Peruano on July 22, 2016, adequate spellings of the toponyms in the normalised alphabets of the indigenous languages must progressively be proposed with the aim of standardising the naming used by the National Geographic Institute (Instituto Geográfico Nacional, IGN) The National Geographic Institute realises the necessary changes in the official maps of Peru.

The Ministry of Culture additionally proposes to the municipalities of the provinces to recover ancient indigenous toponyms and that these names should be spread by the local and communal authorities on posters and other signage.

Notable residents

 Raul Geller (born 1936), Peruvian-Israeli footballer

Gallery

See also 
 Administrative divisions of Peru 
 Machiguenga Communal Reserve
 Megantoni National Sanctuary
 Otishi National Park

Sources

External links 
Travelogue Cusco Region (Sacred Valley of the Incas)

 
Cusco